Park Eun Sun (hangul: 박은선, born in 1965) is a South Korean sculptor.

Early life
Park was born in South Korea in 1965. He graduated from the Department of Fine Arts of the Kyung Hee University is Seoul, and later obtained a degree from the Accademia di Belle Arti di Carrara. Since 1993 he has been living and working in Pietrasanta, Italy. Park uses marble from Carrara, about 20 km from Pietrasanta, for much of his work. His pieces often feature two different colors of marble with prominent cracks, and are usually abstract. The first exhibition that attracted the public's attention was "Mostra di scutura in omaggio a SEM" in 1997. It was held in Pietrasanta and he was invited to the group exhibition. He has had a number of solo and group exhibitions in Europe including in Italy, Germany and France (Musée Bernard Boesch) etc.

Awards 
 2021 -  Honorary citizenship of the Municipality of Pietrasanta 
2018 - Premio Fratelli Rosselli "Pietrasanta e la Versilia nel mondo"
 2015 - Order of Cultural Merit-Seongnuy Medal
 2009 – Sun Prize in the Arts, Sun Gallery

Solo exhibitions
2020
Kyro Art Gallery, Pietrasanta, Italia

2019–2020
Giacomo Puccini Square, Viareggio, Italy
Pisa International Airport ‘Galileo Galilei’, Pisa, Italy
Florence International Airport ‘Amerigo Vespucci’, Florence, Italy

2019 
Hippodrome San Rossore, Pisa, Italy
Art Of The World Gallery, Houston, Texas, United States of America
Monumental Exhibition for Island National Festival 1st Edition, Sam-Hak Island, Mokpo, South Korea

2018
International Award ‘Pietrasanta and Versilia in the World’, Pietrasanta, Italy
ThePage Gallery, Seoul, South Korea
Art Busan 2018, BEXCO Square, Busan, South Korea
Le Musée Galeria d’Art, La Ville Bernard Boesch,  La Baule, France
Hotel Principe, Forte dei Marmi, Italy

2017
Park Eun Sun e il Monumentale, Palazzo Panichi, Museo dei Bozzetti, Pietrasanta, Italy
Duomo Square, Chiesa e Chiostro di Sant’Agostino, Pontile di Marina di Pietrasanta, Italy
Mazzini Square, Viareggio, Italy
Vecchiato Arte Gallery, Pietrasanta, Italy
City Center, Padua, Italy
Vecchiato Arte Gallery, Padua, Italy

2016
Korean Cultural Center, Rome, Italy
Piazzale Michelangelo, Piazza Pitti, Aeroporto A.Vespucci, Giardino delle Rose, San Miniato al Monte, Palazzo Vecchio - Cortile dei Leoni, Florence, Italy

2015
Pisa International Airport 'Galileo Galilei’, Pisa, Italy
Florence International Airport ‘Amerigo Vespucci’, Florence, Italy
Forte dei Marmi, Italy
Villa Ghirlanda, Cinisello, Milan, Italy
Forte di Bard (Museum), Bard, Aosta, Italy
Art Center Materima - Studio Copernico, Casalbeltrame, Novara, Italy
Altes Bad Pfäfers, Bad Ragaz, Switzerland
Mark Peet Visser Gallery, Heusden, Netherlands

2014
Traiano’s Market - Museum of Fori Imperiali, Roma, Italy
Lacke&Farben Gallery, Berlin, Germany
Le Musée Galeria d’Art, La Villa Boesch, Atlantia, La Baule, France
City Center, La Baule, France
         
2013
City Center, Lugano, Switzerland
Hotel Principe Leopoldo, Lugano, Switzerland
Urbengsschlass Gallery, Hesperange, Luxembourg
’La Comune de Hesperange’ Park, Hesperange, Luxembourg
Materima, Studio Copernico, Casalbetrame, Novara, Italy

2012
Villa Bertelli Foundation, Forte dei Marmi, Italy
Carlina Gallery, Turin, Italy
Arena Studio d’Arte, Verona, Italy

2011 
Miniaci Gallery, Milan, Italy
'MARMOMACC 2011’ Henraux Foundation, Verona, Italy

2010 
City CenterAlba, Miroglio, Alba, Italy
City Center, Barolo, Italy
Dosi Gallery, Busan, South Korea

2009
Marino Marini Museum, Florence, Italy
Quattro Mori, Milan, Italy
Sun Gallery, SUN Art Center, Seoul, South Korea

2008
Gana Art Gallery, Seoul, South Korea

2007
‘La Versiliana’ Park, Pietrasanta, Italy

2006
Absolute Art Gallery, Knokke, Belgium
Mark Peet Visser Gallery, Heusden, Netherlands
University of Zürich, Zürich, Switzerland	

2005
San Giorgio Gallery, Milan, Italy

2004
Park Ryu Sook Gallery, Seoul, South Korea

2003
Carlina Gallery, Turin, Italy
Swinger Art Gallery, Verona, Italy

2002
Studio SEM, Pietrasanta, Italy

2001
Park Ryu Sook Gallery, Seoul, South Korea
RHO Gallery, Seoul, South Korea

2000
Bernd Dürr Gallery, München, Germany

1997
Park Ryu Sook Gallery, Seoul, South Korea

1996
Bernd Dürr Gallery, München, Germany
Zehntscheuer Gallery, Münsingen, Germany

1995
Gadarte Gallery, Florence, Italy
Duemme Gallery, Genoa, Italy

Group Exhibitions

2020
“Materia”, Kyro Art Gallery, Pietrasanta, Italy

2019
Art Busan BEXCO, Busan, South Korea
17th  KIAF Korea International Art Fair, Coex, Seoul, South Korea

2018
I Marmi di Henraux, San Miniato, Italy
Art Busan BEXCO, Busan, South Korea
Monaco Yacht Show, Montecarlo
17th  KIAF Korea International Art Fair, Coex, Seoul, South Korea

2017
Art Fair od Bologna, Italy
‘Park Eun Sun e il suo Atelier’, Sala Putti, Chiostro di Sant’Agostino, Pietrasanta, Italy
16th  KIAF Korea International Art Fair, Coex, Seoul, South Korea

2016
Arte Downtown, Padua, Italy
Arte Padova 2016, Vecchiato Arte, Padua, Italy
15th  KIAF Korea International Art Fair, Coex, Seoul, South Korea
Sculpture Biennale Changwon, Changwon, South Korea

2015
BARCU International Art Fair of Bogotá, Bogotá, Colombia
Sculpture Triennale, Bad Ragaz, Vaduz, Switzerland
FIA International Art Fair of Caracas, Venezuela
14th  KIAF Korea International Art Fair, Coex, Seoul, South Korea
CONTEXT International Art Fair od Miami, United States of America

2014~2015
‘Michelangelo e La Versilia’ Italian Cultural Center, New York, United States of America

2014
‘ART STAGE’ Singapore 2014, Singapore
13th  ‘KIAF' Korea International Art Fair, Coex, Seoul, South Korea

2013
Ocean Reef Islands, Panama City, Luz Botero Fine Art Gallery, Panama          
Seoul Art Show 2013, Seoul, South Korea
12th  ‘KIAF’ Korea International Art Fair, Coex, Seoul, South Korea
‘BERLINER LISTE’ 2013 Contemporary Art Fair, Berlin, Germany
The First Biennial of the South in Panama 2013, ‘Summoning Worlds’, Panama
K-Sculpture 2013 Korea Sculpture Festival, Fiesole, Italy
Sun Gallery ‘Korea Abstract’, Sun Art Center, Seoul, South Korea

2012
Shanshui Man, Lig Art SpaceSeoul, South Korea
‘Tra Cielo e Terra’, Ascona, Switzerland
‘Arte Padova 2012' Arena Studio d’arte, Padua, Italy
Museum of Art, Seoul National University, Seoul, South Korea
Art Fair Bologna 2012, Galleria Carlina, Bologna, Italy
K-Sculpture 2012 Korea Sculpture Festival, Pietrasanta, Italy

2011
'Sign Off Design’, Slide Art, Venice, Italy
29th Korean Galleries Art Fair, Seoul, South Korea
Versilia Wine Arte, Pietrasanta, Italy
'Sign Off Design’, Palazzo delle Esposizione, Turin, Italy

2010
28th Korean Galleries Art Fair, Busan, South Korea
'Scultura in Valigia’, Insa Gallery, Seoul, South Korea
Museo del Vino, Barolo, Italy
Marmo Fiera, CosMave, Carrara, Italy

2009
(New acquisitions 2008) National Museum of Contemporary and Modern Art, South Korea
'Scultura in Valigia', Montgomery Museum of Fine Arts, Alabama, United States of America

2008
I Segreti...del Mestiere - Artisti per il Duomo, Pitrasanta, Italy 
Scultura Internazionale - Scultura Natura Oriente Occidente 2008, Turin, Italy
Oisterwijk Sculture 2009, Entienne&Van den Del, Expressivee Contemporary Art, Netherlands
17 Artisti Rappresentanti Coreani di Oggigiorno, Park Ryu Sook Gallery, Seoul, South Korea

2007
‘Sculpture in the Garden’, Harold Martin Botanical Gardens, University of Leicester, England

2006
Art Fair ‘LINEART’, Ghent, Belgium
Holland Art Fair 2006 (HAF), DenHaag, Netherlands
Salon Primavera Rotterdam, Rotterdam, Netherlands
Sculture EN PLEIN AIR, Turin, Italy
Absolute Art Gallery, Brugge, Belgium

2005
MPV Gallery, Heusden, Netherlands
Art Fair, Studio Copernico, Verona, Italy
‘I Segni e le Forme, Due Passi nell’Arte’, Pietrasanta, Italy
Scultura ‘Amor Marmoris’, Levigliani, Italy
Arte Fiera, Sangiorgio Gallery, Bari, Italy
The 5th Anniversary Exhibition of Samsung TESCO, Insa Art Center, Seoul, Corea del Sud
'The Best of…’, Insa Gallery, Seoul, South Korea

2004
‘The Milano International Modern Arts Show’, Palazzo della Permanente, Milan, Italy

2003
Park Ryu Sook 20th Anniversary, Seoul, South Korea
‘Sculpture in the Garden’, Harold Martin Botanical Gardens, University of Leicester, England
Art Fair ‘Bologna 2003’, Galleria Carlina, Bologna, Italia                          
Art Fair ‘MIART’, Galleria Carlina, Swinger Art, Milano, Italia
Art Fair, Swinger Art Gallery, Verona, Italy
Magnetismi delle Forme, Scultori in Centrale ENEL Santa Barbara di Capriglia, Italy
‘Arte per la Vita’, Hotel Kraft, Florence, Italy
Heiri Festival 2003, Park Ryu Sook Gallery, Seoul, South Korea
‘Sculture Carezzate da un Vento Etrusco’, ENEL, Piombino, Italy

2002
Art Fair ‘Cologne’, Park Ryu Sook Gallery, Cologne, Germany
Art Fair ‘Altissima’, Turin, Italy
Art Fair ‘Post’, Park Ryu Sook Gallery, Seoul, South Korea
World Cup Stadium Installation, Suwon, South Korea
‘L’acqua e la vita, Magnetismi delle Forme’, ENEL, Italy

2001
Art Fair ‘Cologne’, Park Ryu Sook Gallery, Cologne, Germany
Bell’Arte Gallery, Maastricht, Netherlands

2000
Arte Fiera ‘Cologne’, Park Ryu Sook Gallery, Cologne, Germany
Die45, Kunst Messe München2000, Germany
Bell’Arte Gallery, Maastricht, Netherlands
Arte&Città 2000, Bologna, Italy

1999
Arte Fiera ‘Cologne’, Park Ryu Sook Gallery, Cologne, Germany
Bell’Arte Gallery, Maastricht, Netherlands

1998
Arte Fiera ‘Basel', Switzerland
Sculture On The Wall, Galleria Sai, Seoul, South Korea
The Swiss Grand Hotel 10thAnniversary&GalleriaSamtuh’s, Seoul, South Korea
‘L’Infinito Possibili’, Pianeta Azzurro Museum, Rome, Italy
Park Ryu Sook Gallery 15th Anniversary, Seoul, South Korea

1997
Unformed, 4 Scultori, Gain Galley, Seoul, South Korea
Mostra di Scultura in omaggio a SEM, Pietrasanta, Italy

1996
Open Arte96 München Bernd Dürr Gallery, München, Germany
Chilford Hall, Cambridge, Englan
‘Two Sculptors’, Galleria Ars Polonia, Varsavia, Poland
In attesa dell’Alba, Pietrasanta, Italy
Scultori e Pittori Contemporanei, Zehntscheuer, Germany

1995
Il Gatto, Florece, Italy 
Art Fair ‘MIART’, Milan, Italy
1st Natura ut Scultura, Camaiore, Italy

1994
Pietra Lavorata, San Nicolò, Italy
Cardo D’Argento, Florence, Italy

1993
Hoo In Gallery, Seoul, South Korea
Ho-Am SamSung Art Museum, Seoul, South Korea

1991
National Museum of Modern and Contemporary Art, South Korea

External links 
 

Prize-winning Work
 KBS TV Successage
Lo scultore coreano che ha messo radici nella Piccola Atene (IL TIRRENO 7 December 2014)
Inaugurata la nuova esposizione di sculture all'aeroporto di Pisa„Arte all'aeroporto: inaugurata la nuova esposizione di sculture dello scalo (Pisa Today 27 June 2015)
이탈리아서 활동 조각가 박은선 "여백의 미 통해" (Yonhapnews 7 Sept.. 2015)
'이탈리아 장인'이 인정한 동양의 남자 '박은선' (Edaily, 14 Sept.. 2015)

References 

1965 births
South Korean sculptors
Kyung Hee University alumni
Living people